The devaluation of sterling in 1949 (or 1949 sterling crisis) was a major currency crisis in the United Kingdom that led to a 30.5% devaluation of sterling from $4.04 per pound to $2.80. Although the devaluation was made in the United Kingdom, over 19 countries had currencies pegged to sterling  and also devalued.

Historical context 
The devaluation, unlike the competitive 1931 sterling devaluation, was done in cooperation between all European nations. There was a general understanding among European nations that sterling was overvalued and would need to be devalued. The IMF was in favour of a devaluation and wanted it to happen to allow other European currencies to also devalue. The timing of the devaluation remained unsure. This led to progressive pressure on the currency, up to a breaking point forcing the British government to devalue.

The fundamental cause of the devaluation was a structural trade deficit of the United Kingdom with the United States. But in the short run, speculation also played a role. As there were capital controls in place, speculation could not take place through regular currency markets as speculative purchases of currency were forbidden by the controls. Instead, speculative pressure mounted through leads and lags.

Consequences 
The immediate consequences of the devaluation were that other countries followed suit. Australia, Burma, Ceylon, Denmark, Egypt, Finland, Greece, India, Iraq, Ireland, Israel, Netherlands, New Zealand, South Africa and Sweden all also devalued their currencies by 30.5%. France, Portugal, Belgium and Canada devalued their currencies slightly less than the UK.

According to Larry Elliott, the devaluation "highlighted Britain's diminished world status".

The devaluation also laid the ground for negotiations that would lead to the European Payments Union (EPU).

See also
 Sterling crisis (disambiguation) list of sterling crisis articles

References

History of the United Kingdom
Currency
History of pound sterling
1949 in the United Kingdom